Edward Herman may refer to:

Edward S. Herman (1925–2017), American economist and media analyst
Ed Herman (born 1980), American mixed martial arts fighter

See also
Edward Hermon (1822-1881), English businessman and MP for Preston in Lancashire
Edward John Herrmann (1913–1999), American Catholic bishop of Columbus
Edward Herrmann (1943–2014), American television and film actor
Ed Herrmann (1946–2013), American baseball player